Miljen "Kreka" Kljaković (born 22 November 1950), is a Serbian production designer and art director. He was awarded César Award  and European Film Award for Best Production Design for his work in Delicatessen. Kljaković is a full member of Art Directors Guild. He is considered to be Serbia's best-known film production designer.

Filmography

Intrigo: Samaria (2019)
Intrigo: Dear Agnes (2019)
Intrigo: Death of an Author (2019)
Tau (2018)
An Ordinary Man (2017)
Mohammad Rasoolollah (2015)
The Pillars of the Earth (TV Mini-Series) (2010)
St. George Shoots the Dragon (2009)
War, Inc. (2008)
Köshpendiler (2005)
Secret Passage (2004)
The Order (2003)
Helen of Troy (2003)
Dune (TV Mini-Series) (2000) 
I Love You, Baby (2000) 
Species II (1998)
The Brave (1997)
Rasputin: Dark Servant of Destiny (1996)
Bila jednom jedna zemlja (TV Mini-Series) (1995)
Underground (1995)
Arizona Dream (1993)
Dom za vesanje (1988)
The Bulldance (1988) 
Jagode u grlu (1985)
Tajvanska kanasta (1985) 
Nema problema (1984)
Jaguarov skok (1984)
The Elusive Summer of '68 (1984)
How I Was Systematically Destroyed by an Idiot (1983)
Nesto izmedju (1982)
Sok od sljiva (1981)
Prestop (1980)
Petria's Wreath (1980)
Kur pranvera vonohet (1979) 
Miris poljskog cveca (1977) 
Specijalno vaspitanje (1977)

References

External links

1950 births
Art directors
Serbian production designers
Serbs of Croatia
Living people